Big Noon Kickoff is an American college football studio show broadcast by Fox, and simulcast on sister network Fox Sports 1 (FS1). Premiering on August 31, 2019, it serves as the pre-game show for Fox College Football, and in particular, Big Noon Saturday—the network's weekly 12:00 p.m ET/9:00 a.m PT kickoff window.

It is hosted by Rob Stone, and features former USC Trojans teammates, running back Reggie Bush and 2004 Heisman Trophy winner quarterback Matt Leinart, former Notre Dame Fighting Irish quarterback Brady Quinn, and former Utah, Florida, and Ohio State coach Urban Meyer as panelists, with Bruce Feldman acting as Fox's CFB insider, as well as Tom Verducci, who usually does baseball for Fox, and Tom Rinaldi, both working on feature reports. Radio host Clay Travis serves as a  contributor, and 1997 Heisman Trophy winner and former Michigan Wolverines cornerback Charles Woodson will also join the show on select weeks, most notably if Michigan is featured.

Meyer was on the show as an analyst for the first two seasons, but left after the 2020 season to take the Jacksonville Jaguars head coaching job, and was replaced by former Oklahoma Sooners head coach Bob Stoops for the 2021 season. Meyer returned for the 2022 season replacing Stoops.

History
In the 2013 season, Fox aired a college football pre-game show on its Fox Sports 1 channel, Fox College Saturday. The program was unable to compete with ESPN's popular and established College GameDay, with Fox only being able to sustain an average viewership of 70,000. The show was cancelled after a single season, and its role was supplanted by the Friday-night edition of Fox Sports Live.

Fox introduced the Big Noon Saturday window for its college football coverage in the 2019 season; the network had aired occasional noon kickoffs during the season before (including, after having acquired the Big Ten's primary football rights in 2017, the Michigan–Ohio State rivalry),  and they were among Fox's top-viewed games in the 2018 season. Fox has positioned the timeslot as featuring one of its flagship games of the day. Fox made that decision in order to boost their ratings by avoiding competition with CBS that has their featured SEC game of the week in the 3:30 p.m. timeslot, and ABC with their featured game in primetime. Big Noon Kickoff was henceforth introduced as a pre-game show for the new window.

Sports Illustrated described the show as being "built around" Urban Meyer (who retired as head coach of the Ohio State Buckeyes at the end of the 2018 season, and had previously been an ESPN analyst). Meyer stated that he had prepared for the role by studying clips of Fox's NFL pre-game show Fox NFL Sunday, and Alex Rodriguez (who joined ESPN's Sunday Night Baseball in 2018), as an example of another player-turned-television analyst. Fox executive producer Brad Zager explained that his presence was meant to help provide "intelligent dialogue" to the show.

For the 2020 season, the program was expanded to two hours. On November 4, 2020, for undisclosed reasons citing CDC and Los Angeles County Department of Health Services guidance, Fox announced that the November 7, 2020 edition of Big Noon Kickoff would not feature the program's usual panel, and that the program would be shortened to one hour. The guest panel was led by Fox NFL Kickoff host Charissa Thompson, joined by Fox NFL Sunday analysts Terry Bradshaw and Howie Long, and Emmanuel Acho from Fox Sports 1's Speak for Yourself. On November 12, Meyer revealed that he had recently recovered from a COVID-19 infection.

Reception
The Big Lead felt that Big Noon Kickoff showed promise, but that the show's "formal" and "corporate" atmosphere (in comparison to the "casual fun" of College GameDay) led to most of the panelists seeming "stiff" on-air, and exacerbated their relative lack of broadcasting experience. Quinn was considered to be a stand-out among the panelists in its premiere broadcast, considering him the most "comfortable" on-air, and noting that both him and Meyer were well-versed at leveraging their past experience to provide insights.

The decision to move the network's featured game to the 12:00pm was met with heavy criticism for substantially diminishing the fan experience at marquee games as those are typically played at night or the late afternoon, and is widely viewed as a money grab. This also forced some games in the Pac-12 to kick off in the morning at the network's choosing, kicking off at either 9:00am or 10:00am local time, another highly criticized consequence of the network's decision.

Viewership
During the first episode, the show garnered 838,000 viewers, which amounted to a 0.8 rating. A special two-hour edition of Big Noon Kickoff leading into the Michigan-Ohio State game on November 30, 2019 received a series-high 1.6 overnight rating, beating College GameDay (which drew a 1.54 rating) in its time slot for the first time in the program's history.

On-site broadcasts
Historically, Big Noon Kickoff regularly didn't do remote broadcasts, preferring to originate from the Fox Sports studio in Los Angeles, unlike College GameDay or SEC Nation. However, the show occasionally did on-location broadcasts, particularly as a lead-in to major games. On November 23, 2019, the show scheduled an on-location edition from Columbus, Ohio for the Ohio State/Penn State rivalry game, which ESPN also chose as its site for College GameDay that week. Fox scheduled four road shows for Big Noon Kickoff in 2020, but only 3 happened, as their scheduled visit to USC was canceled due to Fox holding their crew out that weekend due to COVID-19 protocols, which Urban Meyer later revealed that he dealt with a COVID infection. The first 6 weeks of the 2021 season featured the crew going on the road, a Big Noon Kickoff first. In 2022, Fox announced that Big Noon Kickoff would be held on the road every week of the season.

On-site appearances by team

References

External links
 

2019 American television series debuts
College football studio shows
English-language television shows
Fox Sports
Fox Broadcasting Company original programming
Saturday mass media